Telamon was the father of the hero Ajax in Greek mythology.

Telamon may also refer to:

 Latin name of the Italian town of Talamone
 An architectural support sculpted in the form of a man, also called an atlas (architecture)
 The Telamon, an ancient Greek song
 1749 Telamon, a Jupiter Trojan asteroid
 Telamon (crater), a crater on Saturn's moon Phoebe
 Battle of Telamon, a battle involving the Gauls and the Roman Republic
 Lews Therin Telamon, a fictional character in the book series The Wheel of Time
 USS Telamon (ARB-8), an American naval ship